The Saranathan Temple in Thirucherai, a village in the outskirts of Kumbakonam in the South Indian state of Tamil Nadu, is dedicated to the Hindu god Vishnu. The temple is glorified in the Nalayira Divya Prabandham, the early medieval Tamil canon of the Alvar saints from the 6th–9th centuries CE. It is one of the 108 Divya Desams dedicated to Vishnu, who is worshipped as Saranathan and his consort Lakshmi as Saranayaki. It is believed that Saranathan appeared for Kaveri, the river goddess, who performed penance at this place.

The temple is believed to be of significant antiquity with contributions at different times from Medieval Cholas, the Vijayanagara Empire and Madurai Nayaks. A granite wall surrounds the temple, enclosing all its shrines and three of the four bodies of water. The temple is unique where the presiding deity Vishnu has five consorts. It has also a shrine dedicated to river Kaveri, which is unique feature among all Vishnu temples.

Saranathan is believed to have appeared to the goddess Kaveri, the sage Markandeya and the Hindu god Indra. Six daily rituals and three yearly festivals are held at the temple, of which the chariot festival, celebrated during the Tamil month of Chittirai (March–April), is the most prominent. The temple is maintained and administered by the Hindu Religious and Endowment Board of the Government of Tamil Nadu.

Legend

As per Hindu legend, when time came to destroy the world and finish the yuga, the creator deity, Brahma, was worried. He pleaded Vishnu to tell him a way to keep the tools necessary for srishti (creation) and all the Vedas (scriptures) safe. Vishnu ordered him to put them in a strong mud pot. After trying mud from all places, Brahma finally made a pot out of the sand taken from Thirucherai and saved all Vedas and all necessary aids for creation. Due to the role as saviour for all living thing after the Mahapralaya (dissolution) so this place is called "Sara Shetram".
 
All the rivers approached Brahma to find who is most superior amongst them. He said that during the Vamana avatar, Vishnu appeared as dwarf and later became Trivikrama to the king Mahabali. He placed his third feet on the demon king and cleansed the river Ganga (Ganges) by placing his foot in it. Based on the narration, Brahma quoted that Ganga was the holiest of all rivers. The goddess Kaveri wanted her status to be equal to Ganga and performed a severe penance. To test her devotion, Vishnu appeared in the form of a child in front of her. Realising the anonymity, Kaveri treated the child with care and motherly devotion. Vishnu was pleased with her devotion and revealed all his ten avatars to her and asked her to visit Sara Kshetram and have a holy dip in the Sara Pushkarani. He also granted her the boon that during the Tula month (October - November), she would be considered superior to Ganga.

History

There are two inscriptions in the temple from the period of Chola Parakesari Varman (906-946 AD) and Babasahib of Madavipallam (1728–38) indicating various grants to the temple. The temple is believed to be of significant antiquity with contributions at different times from Medieval Cholas, the Vijayanagara Empire and Madurai Nayaks. The crown of some of the images from the Chola period show influence of Buddhist tradition in the region. The metal image of Sita is believed to be a classic example of Chola Art during the 9th-10th centuries.

After the fall of the Vijayanagar empire in Tanjore, Alagiya Manavala Naicker who ruled Tanjore planned to erect a temple for Rajagopala swamy in Mannarkudi. He appointed his minister Narasa Boopalan for this job. He was to get Blackstones from all possible places. This minister was a great worshipper of Saranatha Perumal of Thirucherai and wanted to erect a temple for him too. So he ordered his men to unload one stone from each cart which passed Thirucherai. A spy of the king caught hold of this and informed the king. The angered king came for an inspection. But before that in overnight Narasa Boopalan constructed this temple and to please the king he added a shrine for Rajagopala swamy. His plan worked and he was saved from the king's anger after that the king ordered to complete the temple with his money.

Architecture

The temple has a temple tank in front of the temple with the same dimension. There is a second gopuram is three-storied and it is located in the first precinct around the sanctum. The stone images of Kaveri and sage Markandeya are housed in the sanctum. The festival deity is accompanied by Bhudevi, Sridevi, and Niladevi. A small idol of Santhanakrishna and Selvar are also housed in the sanctum. The shrine of Saranatha's consort Saranayaki Thayar is located adjacent to the sanctum. The image of both the main idol and the festival image in the Thayar are depicted in seated posture. In the second precinct there is a Kalayana hall, where there is a shrine of Rajagoplaswamy. The images of Rukmini and Satyabhama are also housed in the same shrine. In front of the shrine, the shrine of Thiruvenkatamudayam is situated. There are separate shrines of Rama, Narashima, Kaliyamardhana, Bala Saranatha, Senai Mudaliar, Ramanuja, Pillai Lokacharya, the Alvars and Manavala Mamunigal in the temple. Mudikondan River flows from the west and Kudamurutti River in the south of the temple. There is a shrine of Hanuman from the west end of the temple tank and Vinayaka from the north-eastern side.

The goddess Kaveri is seen in a maternal posture with a child on her lap. The temple is one of the few places where there is a separate shrine for this deity.

Festivals and religious practices

The temple priests perform the puja (rituals) during festivals and on a daily basis based on Pancharatra Agama. As at other Vishnu temples of Tamil Nadu, the priests belong to the Vaishnavaite community, a Brahmin sub-caste. The temple rituals are performed six times a day: Ushathkalam at 7 a.m., Kalasanthi at 8:00 a.m., Uchikalam at 12:00 p.m., Sayarakshai at 6:00 p.m., Irandamkalam at 7:00 p.m. and Ardha Jamam at 10:00 p.m. Each ritual has three steps: alangaram (decoration), neivethanam (food offering) and deepa aradanai (waving of lamps) for both Saranatha Perumal and Saranayagi. During the last step of worship, nadasvaram (pipe instrument) and tavil (percussion instrument) are played, religious instructions in the Vedas (sacred text) are recited by priests, and worshippers prostrate themselves in front of the temple mast. There are weekly, monthly and fortnightly rituals performed in the temple.

The major festival, the twelve-day Brahmotsavam is celebrated during the Tamil month of Thai (January - February). It is believed that it only on the auspicious day of Pushya star of the month that Vishnu descended from Vaikuntam to earth to bestow Kaveri. Rathotsavam, the temple car is drawn during the ninth day of the festival. The other Vaishnavite festivals like Krishna Janmashtami, Karthigai, Tamil New Year, Margazhi ten-day festival, Sankaranthi, Panguni Uthiram and Rohini Utsavam are celebrated.

Religious significance

The temple is revered in the Nalayira Divya Prabandham, the 7th–9th century Sri Vaishnava canon, by Thirumangai Alvar in eleven hymns. The temple is classified as a Divya Desam, one of the 108 Vishnu temples that are mentioned in the compilation. He has mentioned about the devotees of Saranatha who are deeply immersed in Narayana. Divya Kavi Pillai Perumal Aiyangar in his Ashta Prabanda states that people should not waste their time glorifying wealthy men, but should laud the greatness of the almighty. This is the only Divya Desam where Vishnu is seen with five consorts. The temple is represented in five divine elements of Perumal, Nachiyar, Vimana, Tirtha and land and hence called Tirucherai. A Chola king named Satyakeerthi is believed to have worshiped the presiding deity for child birth and was blessed with a son.

During the coronation of Rama, the avatar of Vishnu, Vibishana was presented the sacrosanct Sri Ranga Vimana. He was carrying it all the way to his kingdom of Lanka and midway, to rest, he placed the image on the banks of Kaveri. After performing his routine puja, he tried to lift the Vimana, but it could not be lifted. Mahavishnu appeared to him and said that he desired to stay as Ranganatha in the place, which went on to become Srirangam. Vishnu also desired to watch the Brahmotsavam at Tirucherai. The festivals of the temple are thus considered sacred. The temple is counted as one of the temples built on the banks of the river Kaveri.

As per a local legend, the king of Thanjavur sent material through his minister Narcapapular to the Rajagopalaswamy Temple, Mannargudi, but the minister used the material to build the Thirucherai temple. The king discovered this and wanted to punish the minister. The minister is believed to have prayed to Tirucherai deity to save him from the punishment. But upon seeing the form of Mannargudi temple in this temple, the king relented.

References

External links

Vishnu temples in Tiruvarur district
 
Kaveri River